Kutawato Caves or Kutang Bato Cave is a cave in Cotabato City, Philippines. 
The only cave system in the country, situated within the proper of a Philippine city, the Kutawato Caves is located in the foot of Pedro Colina Hill. It has a lot of hidden underground passageways. One of these is the tunnel connecting the cave to Tamontaka Church, the oldest church in the city.

This cave was also the source of the city's present name kuta means fort and wato means stone.

Hence, the name 'fort of stone' which later on became Cotabato. Its wall of white, beige and brownish shade glitters in the dark and echoes a colorful past dating back to the days when no foreign foot yet trampled upon this land.

The cave had given sanctuary to the natives when the Spaniards tried to convert them into the Castillan faith and has served the purpose when Filipino guerillas fought the invading force of Japanese Imperial army during the World War II. When the Japanese firepower proved superior to that of the natives, the cave was then used as an armory and even a garrison. There are four entrances, namely : the provincial Capitol Cave, Bagua Cave, Caverna Espanol and the Kuweba ni Satur.

References

Caves of the Philippines
Tourist attractions in Maguindanao del Norte
Cotabato City
Landforms of Maguindanao del Norte